The Make-Up Artists and Hair Stylists Guild Award for Best Period and/or Character Make-Up in a Feature-Length Motion Picture is one of the awards given annually to people working in the motion picture industry by the Make-Up Artists and Hair Stylists Guild (MUAHS). It is presented to the makeup artists whose work has been deemed "best" in a given year, within a period-set film, and/or for specific character makeup. The award was first given in 2014, during the sixth annual awards. For the first five ceremonies, the period and character aspects of the category were separated, and awarded individually.

Winners and nominees

1990s
Best Character Makeup - Feature

Best Period Makeup - Feature

2000s
Best Character Makeup - FeatureBest Period Makeup - Feature2010sBest Period and/or Character Makeup - Feature FilmsBest Period and/or Character Make-Up in a Feature-Length Motion Picture'''

2020s

References

Period and/or Character Make-Up in a Feature-Length Motion Picture
Awards established in 2013